Des Sources is a planned Réseau express métropolitain (REM) station in the city of Pointe-Claire, Quebec, Canada, scheduled to open in the second quarter of 2024. It is planned to be operated by CDPQ Infra and to serve as a station of the Anse-à-l'Orme branch of the REM. The planned site is near the intersection of Des Sources Boulevard, its namesake, and Hymus Boulevard.

References

Railway stations in Montreal
Transport in Pointe-Claire
Réseau express métropolitain railway stations
Buildings and structures in Pointe-Claire
Railway stations scheduled to open in 2024